The Million Woman March was a protest march organized on October 25, 1997 involving approximately half a million people in Benjamin Franklin Parkway,Philadelphia and Pennsylvania. A major theme of the march was family unity and what it means to be an African American woman in America. The women of the march called for the following things: repentance for the pain of black women caused by one another, the restoration and resurrection of African American family and community bonds.

Overview

The march was founded and formulated by Phile Chionesu, a grassroots activist, human rights advocate, black nationalist/freedom fighter, and owner of an African crafts shop.  She was not associated with any national black organizations.  After several months of underground organizing, Chionesu asked Asia Coney to join her, making her the third National Co-Chair. The march was envisioned and intended to help bring social and economic development and power throughout the black communities of the United States, as well as to bring; hope, empowerment, unity and sisterhood to women, men and children of African descent globally regardless of nationality, religion, or economic status.

A major theme of the march was family unity and what it means to be an African American woman in America. The women of the march called for three things: repentance for the pain of black women caused by one another, the restoration and resurrection of African American family and community bonds. The march included scheduled hours of prayer and speeches.

The day was filled with prayer, music, and speeches. These events were meant to promote positive change. The march started from the Liberty Bell and ended at the steps of the Philadelphia Art Museum. Speakers at the event included Winnie Madikizela-Mandela, the ex-wife of Nelson Mandela; Congresswoman Maxine Waters; Sista Souljah; Jada Pinkett Smith; Attallah and Ilyasah Shabazz, the daughters of Malcolm X; and Dr. Dorothy Height. A message was read from Assata Shakur from her exile home of Cuba.

The march has been considered a social phenomenon due to its unconventional and unique way of organizing. It has influenced several mass gatherings by demonstrating a grassroots approach that had not been employed before.  These women were able to use different methods of spreading information via media coordinators like BWN NJ Delegate Stacey Chambers, Alpha Kappa Alpha, and, by word of mouth, fliers, black-run media, the Internet, and a network of women's organizations. The Million Woman March was the launching pad for the development of the first global movement for women and girls of African descent throughout the diaspora.

Attendance
Estimates of attendance for the march vary widely. The Philadelphia police gave no official estimates, but were preparing for up to 600,000 people. However, a study provided by the University of Pennsylvania in addition to aerial footage, photos, and other research data and information obtained from news and other sources, indicates that the gathering drew at least 500,000 people. Police sources gave numbers varying from 300,000 to 1 million. The attendees came even despite cold temperatures and light rain.

Organizers estimated an attendance of 2.1 million. Phile Chionesu suggested there were more than 2.5 million people. "The rally brought together women from across the country – some wearing jeans and sweat shirts, others in festive African garb." There were signs throughout the march saying, "I am one in a million" and "Black Women: No more AIDS, abuse, addiction". Supporters also bought buttons, T-shirts, hats and flags with march logos.

Mission
The mission of the Million Woman March was for African American women to be self-determined.

The march was also intended to draw attention to statistics that marginalize African American women. Research has shown that 94 of 1,000 African American teenage girls are victims of violent crime. African American women are eighteen times more likely to get AIDS than white women. In 1996, African American men earned thirty dollars more than African American women per week, while, African American women were paid forty dollars less than white women per week. From these statistics, African American women and supporters wanted to take a stand, and part of the protest was because of inequalities like these.

The Million Woman March has continued its mission under the direction of the founder and national offices. Since the march, over 50 conferences, over 100 forums, online radio broadcasts for 12 years, and many social justice protests for women and African American females have taken place.

See also

Africana womanism
Million Man March
Million Puppet March

References

External links

1997 in Pennsylvania
African-American women
Post–civil rights era in African-American history
Protest marches in the United States
October 1997 events in the United States
Women's marches in the United States
1997 in women's history
African-American history of Pennsylvania
History of women in Pennsylvania